Hyssopus officinalis or hyssop is a shrub in the Lamiaceae or mint family native to Southern Europe, the Middle East, and the region surrounding the Caspian Sea. Due to its purported properties as an antiseptic, cough reliever, and expectorant, it has been used in traditional herbal medicine.

Description
The stem is woody at the base, from which grow a number of upright branches.

During the summer, hyssop produces pink, blue, or, more rarely, white fragrant flowers. These give rise to small oblong tetra-achenes.

History

A plant called hyssop has been in use since classical antiquity. Its name is a direct adaptation from the Greek ὕσσωπος. The Hebrew word אזוב (ezov, esov, or esob) and the Greek word ὕσσωπος probably share a common (but unknown) origin. The name hyssop appears as a translation of ezov in some translations of the Bible, notably in : "Purge me with hyssop, and I shall be clean", but researchers have suggested that the Biblical accounts refer not to the plant currently known as hyssop but rather to one of a number of different herbs, including Origanum syriacum (Syrian oregano, commonly referred to as "bible hyssop").  mentions that 'ezov' was a small plant and some scholars believe it was a wall plant. It was burned with the Red Heifer and used for purification of lepers , and at Passover it was used to sprinkle the blood of the sacrificial lamb on the doorposts. A sponge attached to a hyssop branch was used to give Jesus on the cross a drink of vinegar.

Suggestions abound for the modern day correlation of biblical hyssop ranging from a wall plant like moss or fern, to widely used culinary herbs like thyme, rosemary or marjoram. Another suggestion is the caper plant which is known to grow in the rocky soils of the region and along walls.

Hyssop was also used for purgation (religious purification) in Egypt, where, according to Chaeremon the Stoic, the priests used to eat it with bread in order to purify this type of food and make it suitable for their austere diet.

Cultivation
Hyssop is resistant to drought, and tolerant of chalky, sandy soils. It thrives in full sun and warm climates.

Cultivars include 'Blue Flower'.

Harvest
Under optimal weather conditions, herb hyssop is harvested twice yearly, once at the end of spring and once more at the beginning of autumn. The plants are preferably harvested when flowering in order to collect the flowering tips.

Once the stalks are cut, they are collected and dried either stacked on pallets to allow for draining or hung to dry. The actual drying process takes place in a cool, dry, well-ventilated area, where the materials are mixed several times to ensure even drying. Drying herbs are kept from exposure to the sun to prevent discoloration and oxidation. The drying process takes approximately six days in its entirety. Once dried, the leaves are removed and both components, leaves and flowers, are chopped finely. The final dried product weighs a third of the initial fresh weight and can be stored for up to 18 months.

Essential oil
The essential oil includes the chemicals thujone and phenol, which give it antiseptic properties. Its high concentrations of thujone and chemicals that stimulate the central nervous system, including pinocamphone and cineole, can provoke epileptic reactions. The oil of hyssop can cause seizures and even low doses (2–3 drops) can cause convulsions in children.

Uses

Culinary
The fresh herb is commonly used in cooking. Za'atar is a famous Middle Eastern herbal mixture, some versions of which include dried Hyssop leaves.

Essence of hyssop can be obtained by steaming, and is used in cooking to a lesser extent.

The plant is commonly used by beekeepers to produce nectar from which western honey bees make a rich and aromatic honey.

Herb hyssop leaves are used as an aromatic condiment. The leaves have a lightly bitter taste due to its tannins, and an intense minty aroma. Due to its intensity, it is used moderately in cooking. The herb is also used to flavor liqueur, and is part of the official formulation of Chartreuse. It is also a key ingredient in many formulations of absinthe, where it is the main source of the green colour.

Herbal medicine
In herbal medicine hyssop is believed to have soothing, expectorant, and cough suppressant properties. Hyssop has been used for centuries in traditional medicine in order to increase circulation and to treat multiple conditions such as coughing and sore throat. Hyssop can stimulate the gastrointestinal system.

Gallery

References

External links
 
 

Herbs
Lamiaceae
Medicinal plants
Plants described in 1753
Taxa named by Carl Linnaeus
Flora of the Mediterranean Basin
Mediterranean cuisine